The Korean People's Army Air and Anti-Air Force (KPAAF; ; Hanja: 朝鮮人民軍 航空 및 反航空軍 ) is the unified military aviation force of North Korea. It is the second largest branch of the Korean People's Army comprising an estimated 110,000 members. It possesses around 950 aircraft of different types, mostly of decades-old Soviet and Chinese origin. Its primary task is to defend North Korean airspace.

History

Early years (1945–1949) 
The Korean People's Army Air and Anti-Air Force began as the "Korean Aviation Society(조선 항공대)" in 1945. It was organized along the lines of flying clubs in the Soviet Union. In 1946, the society became a military organization and became an aviation division of the Korean People's Army (KPA). It became a branch of the army in its own right in November 1948. Training personnel for what was now known as the "Korean People's Air Force Air Corps" was a major hurdle, with the Soviets reporting in May 1950 that of the 120 trained pilots, only 32 were combat qualified. The only experienced pilots in North Korea before this were those who flew for the IJAAF. These pilots were however rejected by society and the regime. Nevertheless, on June 25, 1950, the KPAF started flying support mission for the Invasion of South Korea.

Korean War: Invasion of South Korea and UN Offensive (June – November 1950) 
During the early period of the war, the Il-10 Beasts were the main bombers used in the strikes against airfields in South Korea, while Yak-9/9P Franks as well other trainer and fighter aircraft were used in CAP and Strafing attacks. North Korea's Air Force also at that time had many Japanese aircraft including a Ki-54 transport. Only one encounter with USAF aircraft occurred when two unknown North Korean aircraft attacked two F-82 Twin Mustangs. The KPAF aircraft were out of range and thus failed to score any kills.

On June 27, a USAF F-82 shot down a Yak-11 Trainer that was escorted by four Yak-9s. On the 29th, after Seoul fell, a strike was conducted on Suwon Airfield by 3 Il-10s and 6 Yak-9s, destroying an American C-54 Skymaster on the ground. A second strike on Suwon was however intercepted by F-80C Shooting Stars.

Throughout July and August, the KPAF continued in supporting the ground offensive near the Pusan Perimeter. During that time, they came into increasing contact with USAF and USN jet aircraft, resulting in more losses. 

During the first-ever strike by carrier-borne jet aircraft on July 3, 1950, VF-51, from USS Valley Forge CV-45, claimed the first kill by a naval jet when an F9F-3 Panther shot down a KPAF Yak-9P. On that day, many KPAF Yak-9Ps were caught on the ground scrambling, with many reportedly taking off towards each other. In the end, the Pyongyang, Pyongyang East and Onjong-Ni Airfields (which were targeted in the strike), were hit successfully while the KPAF lost many of their aircraft. At the same time, USAF B-29 Superfortresses, P-80Cs, F-51 Mustangs and B-26 Invaders began to attack ground targets inside North Korea, encountering very little resistance from the KPAF.

Soviet sources reported that the KPAF was no longer operating after August 10 and was finally wiped out by a strike by USN aircraft on August 22. For their part, the KPAF only shot down 3 US aircraft in air combat (a B-29, an L-4 and an L-5). On November 6, 1950, two Yak-9Ps shot down by F-51Ds from 67th FBS became the last KPAF propeller aircraft lost.

Reorganization (November 1950–1953) 
After the heavy losses encountered in July and August 1950, the Soviets began to train the North Koreans to fly the MiG-15 Fagot, although the Soviets were the first to fly the MiG against the UN Forces. Although many North Korean pilots were experienced when they flew the MiG-15, the Soviets admitted that most were highly inexperienced.

Post-Korean War 
The KPAF has on occasion deployed abroad. It deployed a fighter squadron to North Vietnam during the Vietnam War. Kim Il-sung reportedly told the North Korean pilots "to fight in the war as if the Vietnamese sky were their own."

On April 15, 1969, MiG-21s of the KPAF shot down a Lockheed EC-121 Warning Star in international waters, in the Sea of Japan. In 1973, a North Korean flight of MiG-21s deployed to Bir Arida to help defend southern Egypt during the Yom Kippur War. In 1990–91, North Korea activated four forward air bases near the Korean Demilitarized Zone (DMZ).

Organization

Capabilities 
The KPAF operates a wide range of fighter and attack aircraft. North Korea is one of the few nations still operating the obsolete MiG-17, MiG-19, MiG-21 and MiG-23 fighters, yet it operates more modern and fairly capable MiG-29 fighters. Analysts have also long speculated whether the KPAF fields the MiG-25, however no evidence has yet emerged as to whether they do field MiG-25s. The KPAF's most numerous fighter is the MiG-21, which is somewhat obsolete, but still a worthy foe in air-to-air combat, if maintained properly and crewed by experienced pilots. An assessment by US analysts GlobalSecurity.org reported that the air force "has a marginal capability for defending North Korean airspace and a limited ability to conduct air operations against South Korea."

North Korea operates a wide variety of air defense equipment, from short-range MANPADS such as 9K34 Strela-3, 9K38 Igla and ZPU-4 heavy machine guns, to long-range SA-5 Gammon and Pon'gae-5 SAM systems and large-calibre AA artillery guns. North Korea has one of the densest air defence networks in the world. Ilyushin Il-28 Beagle bombers provide a medium-range attack platform, despite being generally obsolete, although it is likely they have the ability to launch Kh-35 and P-15 Termit missiles. A large part of the ground attack aircraft are kept in heavily fortified hangars, some of which are capable of withstanding a nearby nuclear blast. Stealth capacity is known in the KPAF through researching in radar-absorbing paint and inventory deception.

It has been noted that the North Korean Air Force operates a few MD-500 helicopters that were exported to North Korea by West German merchants through Soviet vessels in the 1980s. Several were seen equipped with Soviet AT-3 anti-tank missiles during a military parade commemorating 60 years since Korean War armistice. They later made another public appearance at the Wonsan Air Festival in which they were seen sporting the new green camouflage paint scheme that has also been incorporated on An-2s and Mi-17s that have also been displayed at the air show.

KPAF possesses precision guided munitions such as Kh-25 and Kh-29 air to ground missiles along jamming pods such as SPS-141 for SAM suppression. At least some of Il-28's/H-5's bombers are capable of launching air launched variant of Kumsong-3 anti-ship cruise missiles with known flight tests done in 2008 and 2011. Ground launched coastal defense variant of Kumsong-3 has range of 240 kilometers. The KPAF still incorporates much of the original Soviet air tactics, as well as North Korean experience from the UN bombings during the Korean War.

Personnel
From 1978 to 1995, General Jo Myong-rok was the commander of the air force. In October 1995, he was promoted to vice-marshal and appointed Chief of the KPA General Political Bureau and a member of the Korean Workers' Party Central Military Committee. His place as commander of the Air Force was taken by Colonel General O Kum-chol.

Annual flying hours
The number of annual flying hours (AFH) per pilot is, like almost every other aspect of the KPAF, very hard to estimate. Most sources on the subject abstain from giving hard numbers, but all of them estimate the average annual flying hours per pilot as being 'low' to 'very low'. The number of annual flying hours is very important in estimating the individual skill and experience of the pilots of an air force: more annual flying hours suggests better trained pilots. Most estimates present a rather grim picture: AFH per pilot for the KPAF are said to be only 15 or 25 hours per pilot each year - comparable to the flying hours of air forces in ex-Soviet countries in the early 1990s. In comparison, most NATO fighter pilots fly at least 150 hours a year. Ground training, both in classrooms, on instructional airframes or in a flight simulator can only substitute for 'the real thing' to a certain degree, and the low number of modern jet trainers in the KPAF arsenal points to a very modest amount of flying time for the formation of new pilots.

There are a number of possible explanations for the low AFH: concern over the aging of equipment, scarcity of spare parts - especially for the older aircraft - difficulties with worn airframes, fear of defection and the scarcity of fuel are all contributing factors. It is very likely however that some 'elite' pilots and regiments receive considerably more flying hours. Especially those equipped with modern aircraft and tasked with homeland defence - like the 57th regiment flying MiG-29s and the 60th regiment flying MiG-23s - are receiving multiple times the average AFH per pilot; however, aging equipment, the scarcity of fuel and the general economic crisis in North Korea will affect these regiments as well, and keep their AFH low compared to NATO AFH.

Agence France-Presse reported on January 23, 2012, that the KPAF had conducted more flight training than average in 2011.

The Chosun Ilbo reported on March 29, 2012, that the KPAF had dramatically increased the number of flights to 650 per day.

Tongil News reported on July 20, 2013, that KPAF's fighter jets and helicopters had conducted 700 sorties a day for 11 days as reported by a source in South Korean government on March 13 after Key Resolve military exercise started on March 11. Seven hundred hours of sorties is considered by the United States military as the capability to wage all-out war.

Structure 
Following is a list of bases where North Korean Army Air Force aircraft are permanently based.

Air bases 
 Northwestern area (1st Air Combat Division, HQ Kaechon)

 West Coast and Pyongyang area (1st Air Combat Division) - HQ: Kaechon
Pyongyang is also the location of HQ, KPAAF
 Uiju - 24th Air Regiment {Bomber} (H-5/Il-28, MiG-21PFM)
 Kaechon       - 35th Air Regiment {Fighter} (J-6/MiG-19)
 Onchon        - 36th Air Regiment {Fighter} (J-6/MiG-19)
 Sunchon       - 55th Air Regiment {Attack} (Su-25K), 57th Air Regiment {Fighter} (MiG-29/UB)
 Panghyon      - 49th Air Regiment {Fighter Bomber} (J-5/MiG-17F, MiG-21PFM, Mi-2)
 Pukchang      - 58th Air Regiment {Fighter} (MiG-23ML/UM), 60th Air Regiment {Fighter Bomber} (MiG-21Bis)

 West coast and Pyongyang area (5th Transport Division) - HQ: Taechon
 Taechon       - ?? Air Regiment {Transport} (Y-5/An-2)
 Kwaksan       - ?? Air Regiment {Transport} (Y-5/An-2)
 Kangdong      - ?? Air Regiment {Bomber} (CJ-6/BT-6)
 Sonchon       - ?? Air Regiment {Helicopter} (Mi-2)
 Pukchang East - 65th Air Regiment {Helicopter} (Mi-8T, Mi-26), 64th Air Regiment {Helicopter} (MD-500)
 Pyongyang Sunan Intl - Special Service Air Transport Wing (KPAAF-CAAK) (Air Koryo) (Tu-134B/Tu-154B-2/Il-62M/Il-76MD/Il-18/An-24/An-148)
 Mirim Airfield - ?? VIP Unit (Mi-17) This base serves as a light transport base and closed sometime in the 1990s, now used as a KPA training facility.

 DMZ area (3rd Air Combat Division) - HQ: Hwangju
 Chunghwa - Headquarters, Air Defense and Combat Command
 Taetan    -  4th Air Regiment {Fighter Bomber} (J-5/MiG-17F, MiG-21PFM, Mi-2)
 Nuchon-ni - 32nd Air Regiment {Fighter Bomber} (J-5/MiG-17, MiG-21PFM, Mi-2)
 Kwail     - 33rd Air Regiment {Fighter Bomber} (J-5/MiG-17F), 11th Air Regiment {Fighter Bomber} (J-5/MiG-17F)
 Hwangju   - 50th Air Regiment {Fighter} (MiG-21PFM)
 Koksan    - 86th Air Regiment {Attack} (Q-5A)
 Ayang-ni  - 63rd Air Regiment {Attack Helicopter} (Mi-24D)

 East Coast area (2nd Air Combat Division) - HQ: Toksan
 Toksan     - 56th Air Regiment {Fighter}(MiG-21PF/J-7/F-7)
 Chanjin-Up - 25th Air Regiment {Bomber} (Il-28/H-5); ??th Air Regiment {Fighter} (MiG-21PFM)
 Wonsan     - 46th Air Regiment {Fighter}(MiG-21PFM,F-5), 66th Air Regiment {Helicopter} (Mi-14PL)
 Kuum Ni    - 71st Air Regiment {Fighter}(MiG-21PFM)
 Hwangsuwon - 72nd Air Regiment {Fighter}(MiG-21PFM)

 East Coast area (6th Transport Division) - HQ: Sondok
 Sondok - ?? Air Regiment {Transport} (Y-5/An-2)
 Yonpo - ?? Air Regiment {Transport} (Y-5/An-2)
 Manpo - ?? Air Regiment {Transport} (Y-5/An-2)
 Kuktong - ?? Air Regiment {Transport} (Y-5/An-2)
 Kowon - Air Transport Wing (6 TD) (Z-5/Mi-4/Mi-8/Mi-17)
 Pakhon - Air Transport Wing (6 TD) (Z-5/Mi-4/Mi-8/Mi-17/Mi-2)

 Far Northeast area (8th Training Division) - HQ: Orang
 Samiyon Airfield - ?? Training Regiment (F-5A)
 Hyesan Airfield - unknown unit
 Kilchu West + East - ?? Air Regiment {Helicopter Training} (Mi-2)
 Orang - 41st Air Regiment {Fighter Training}(MiG-15UTI/J-2/MiG-15)
 Sungam-Chonhjin - Kimchaek Air Force Academy (BT-6)
 Kyongsong - Flight Officers School (BT-6)
 Kang Da Ri Airfield - Underground runway near Wonsan, under construction.
 Tongchŏn Airfield(MiG-21PF/J-7/F-7)
 Inhung - Helipads (Mi-8/Ka-27 (possibly Ka-28/Ka-29/Ka-32))
 Hamhŭng Airfield(MiG-21PF/J-7/F-7)
 Sungam Airfield - Air Transport Wing (Y-5/An-2)
 Riwon north Airfield - (MiG-15UTI/J-2/MiG-15)

Inventory

Current aircraft

Armament

Equipment

Ranks and uniforms

Ranks
The Korean People's Air Force has five categories of ranks: general officers, senior officers, junior officers, non-commissioned officers, and airmen.

Enlisted

Officers

Marshals
Occasionally KPA Air Force officers are promoted above General of the Air Force. In that case, they wear an army-style uniform, since ranks from Vice-Marshal and above are not divided into army, navy and air force.

Uniforms 
Generally as a separate service in the KPA, the service wears the same KPA uniforms but with air force blue peaked caps (especially for officers) or kepi-styled caps for men and berets for women, worn with their full dress uniforms. Pilots wear helmets and flight suits when on parade and when in flight duty while air defense personnel wear the same duty dress uniforms as their ground forces counterparts but with air force blue borders on the caps.

Defections 
Due to the political condition of North Korea, several North Korean pilots from the KPAF defected with their jets. These incidents include:
 On September 21, 1953, 21-year-old No Kum-sok, a senior lieutenant, flew his MiG-15 across to the South and landed at Kimpo Air Base near Seoul. Considered an intelligence bonanza, since this fighter plane was then the best the Communist bloc had. No was awarded the sum of $100,000 ($ in  dollars) and the right to reside in the United States. He was awarded American citizenship.
 On August 5, 1960, a Shenyang J-5 landed at Kimpo, the second time a J-5 appeared in South Korea. This aircraft was kept by South Korea and was briefly flown in South Korean markings before being scrapped.
 In February 1983, Lee Ung-pyong used a training exercise to defect and landed his Shenyang J-6 at an airfield in Seoul. According to the then common practice, he received a commission in the Republic of Korea Air Force (ROKAF), eventually becoming a colonel and teaching at the South Korean academy until his death in 2002. He received a reward of 1.2 billion South Korean won.
 On May 23, 1996, Captain Lee Chul-su defected with another Shenyang J-6, number 529, to Suwon Air Base, South Korea. He reportedly left behind his wife and two children. Lee was rewarded 480 million South Korean Won (approx. 400 thousand US dollars). He is now a colonel in the ROKAF and is an academic instructor.

See also
 Air Koryo
 Jebi Sports Group, football club of the KPAF
 Korean People's Army
 North Korean Ground Force
 North Korean Navy
 Republic of Korea Air Force

References

External links 

 The North Korean Air Force by Google Earth: a compilation of Google Earth images of North Korean fighters, bombers, ground attack aircraft, transports, and special-operations aircraft
 Korean People's Air Force Victory record by Jan Josef Safarik

 
Military of North Korea
Military units and formations established in 1945